Parorectis sublaevis is a species of tortoise beetle in the family Chrysomelidae. It is found in Central America and North America.

References

Further reading

 
 
 
 
 
 
 
 

Cassidinae
Beetles described in 1946